Eric Pearson (born December 14, 1984) is an American screenwriter. He has worked with Marvel Studios, writing various short films for their Marvel One-Shots series of films, and writing the screenplay for the feature films Thor: Ragnarok (2017), Black Widow (2021), and Godzilla vs. Kong (2021).

Early life and career 
He studied screenwriting at New York University's Tisch School of the Arts. He was enrolled in Marvel Studios' screenwriting program in 2010.

Filmography

Short films
 The Consultant (2011)
 A Funny Thing Happened on the Way to Thor's Hammer (2011)
 Item 47 (2012)
 Agent Carter (2013)

Feature films
 Thor: Ragnarok (2017)
 Godzilla vs. Kong (2021)
 Black Widow (2021)
 Thunderbolts (2024)

Uncredited rewrites
 Ant-Man (2015)
 Spider-Man: Homecoming (2017)
 Pacific Rim: Uprising (2018)
 Avengers: Infinity War (2018)
 Avengers: Endgame (2019)
 Pokémon: Detective Pikachu (2019)

Television

References

External links 
 

Living people
21st-century American screenwriters
American male screenwriters
American science fiction writers
American fantasy writers
Place of birth missing (living people)
Tisch School of the Arts alumni
21st-century American male writers
1984 births